The Minister for the Interior of Luxembourg is responsible for regional planning, including relations with neighboring German, French and Belgian regions in the context of the "Greater Region of Luxembourg". He/she is also responsible for relations with the communes and, since 2009 again, for the police. Since 5 December 2018, the Minister is Taina Bofferding.

See also
List of Ministers for the Police Force of Luxembourg

External links
 Site of the Ministry for the Interior (in French)

Government ministers of Luxembourg